Donald Michael Paul (born April 17, 1963) is an actor, director, writer, and producer.

Biography
He starred in the films Heart of Dixie and Rich Girl with Jill Schoelen and appeared in Aloha Summer. He wrote the screenplay for Harley Davidson and the Marlboro Man. He acted in the short-lived 1992 CBS detective series The Hat Squad. He played a prominent role in Models Inc. and Robot Wars.

He has directed several films, including Half Past Dead in 2002, Lake Placid: The Final Chapter (2012), and Tremors 5: Bloodlines.

Filmography

Films

Filmmaking credits 

Also creative consultant and second unit director in 2011 Seven Days in Utopia.

Acting credits

Television

Filmmaking credits

Acting credits

Music video 

 2011 I Wish, I Wish for Lauren Bennett

Commercials

References

External links 
 

1963 births
20th-century American male actors
21st-century American male actors
American film directors
American film producers
American male film actors
American male screenwriters
Living people